Choiseul may refer to:

People
Choiseul family, noble family in France 
 César, duc de Choiseul (1602–1675), French marshal and diplomat known as marshal du Plessis-Praslin
 César Gabriel de Choiseul (1712–1785), duc de Praslin, French officer, diplomat and statesman
 Claude Antoine Gabriel, duc de Choiseul-Stainville (1760–1838), French royalist
 Claude de Choiseul (1632–1711), marshal of France in 1693
 Étienne François, duc de Choiseul (1719–1785), French officer, diplomat and statesman
 François Joseph de Choiseul, marquis de Stainville (1700–1770), French diplomat and statesman

Places
 Choiseul, Haute-Marne, a commune in the Haute-Marne département in France
 Choiseul Quarter, a quarter of Saint Lucia, a Caribbean island nation
 Choiseul, Saint Lucia, the main city of Choiseul Quarter
 Choiseul Island, the largest island of Choiseul Province in the Solomon Islands, named after Étienne François de Choiseul
 Choiseul Province, a province of Solomon Islands
 Choiseul Bay, a bay in Choiseul Island
 Choiseul Sound, a strait in the Falkland Islands

Other uses
 Choiseul (surname)
 Choiseul Camp, a concentration camp in Châteaubriant, Brittany, France from 1941 to 1942
 Choiseul constituency, a former constituency in Solomon Islands
 Choiseul languages, a group of Northwest Solomonic languages
 Institut Choiseul for International Politics and Geoeconomics, a French, non-partisan think tank